Hugh Norman Davidson (born 3 August 1980 in Dundee) is a Scottish retired footballer who played as a midfielder. During his career he played for Dundee United, Forfar Athletic, Arbroath and Montrose and had loan spells with Raith Rovers and Stirling Albion. He made four appearances for the Scotland under-21 team.

Career
Having been developed as a player through Dundee United's youth scheme, Davidson made his debut in the 1999-00 season. Davidson made 23 league appearances in his first season, mostly from the start, although he failed to score from his right midfield position. The following season, he made only eleven league appearances, and despite scoring his first league goal, would not feature again in the United first team as of injuries. Davidson spent all of 2002 on loan at Raith Rovers and Stirling Albion, and it was no surprise when he moved away permanently to Forfar Athletic again due to injuries in time for the 2003-04 season. Davidson spent two seasons at Station Park before moving to Arbroath for the 2005-06 season. In January 2006, he moved, this time to Montrose. In January 2009, Davidson signed a contract extension until 2011. At the end of the 2010/11 season, Davidson announced his retirement from football.

Career statistics

References

External links 
 

1980 births
Footballers from Dundee
Dundee United F.C. players
Raith Rovers F.C. players
Stirling Albion F.C. players
Forfar Athletic F.C. players
Arbroath F.C. players
Montrose F.C. players
Living people
Scottish footballers
Scottish Premier League players
Scottish Football League players
Scotland under-21 international footballers
Association football midfielders